Heidar is a name, chiefly in Arabic, with variant spellings such as Haydar, Haider, and Heydar. It may refer to:

Given name
Haidar al-Abbadi, Iraqi prime minister
Haidar Ali (c. 1722 – 1782), ruler of the Indian Kingdom of Mysore
Heidar Aliev (1923–2003), third President of Azerbaijan for the New Azerbaijan Party from October 1993 to October 2003
Haidar Abdel-Shafi (1919–2007), Palestinian physician and community leader
Haidar Abdul-Amir (born 1982), Iraqi football player
Haidar Abdul-Jabar (born 1976), Iraqi football player
Haidar Abdul-Razzaq (born 1982), Iraqi football player
Haïdar el Ali, Senegalese ecologist and government minister
Haidar Abu Bakr al-Attas (1939–), Prime Minister of Yemen
Heidar Arfaa (1919–1976), Conseiller d'État to Shah Mohammad Reza Pahlavi of Iran
Haidar Bagir, Indonesian philosopher, entrepreneur, social activist
Haidar Khan (died c. 1925), leader of one of the Bakhtiari tribes in Iran
Haidar Mahmoud (born 1973), Iraqi football player
Haidar Malik (1620s), administrator, and soldier in Kashmir
Heidar Moslehi (born 1957), Iranian cleric and politician who served as the minister of intelligence from 2009 to 2013
Haidar Nasir (born 1981), also known as Haider Jabreen, Iraqi discus thrower
Haidar Obeid (born 1997), Lebanese Roboticist
Haidar Qassāb (died 1356), head of the Sarbadars of Sabzewar from 1355/56 until his death
Haidar Sabah (born 1986), Iraqi football player
Haidar Salim, Afghan singer
Haidar Al-Shaïbani (born 1984), Algerian-Canadian football (soccer) player

Middle name
Khwaja Haidar Ali Aatish (1778–1848), Urdu poet
Maya Haïdar Boustani, Lebanese archaeologist and museum curator
Mirza Muhammad Haidar Dughlat (1499 or 1500–1551), Chagatai Turko-Mongol military general, ruler of Kashmir

Surname
Adnan Haidar (born 1989), Norway-born Lebanese football player
Ali Haidar (basketball) (born 1990), Canadian basketball player of Lebanese origin
Ali Haidar (military) (1913–1999), Pakistani Pashtun military personality in British Indian Army
Ali Haidar (politician) (born 1962), Syrian politician and minister
Aminatou Heidar (born 1966), Sahrawi human rights activist and an advocate of the independence of Western Sahara
Dana Haidar (born 1993), Jordanian taekwondo player
Ensaf Haidar, Indian Human rights activist
Gul Haidar, former mujahideen commander and official in the Afghan Ministry of Defense
Haidar Haidar, Syrian writer and novelist
Knut Heidar (born 1949), Norwegian political scientist
Mohamad Haidar (born 1989), Lebanese football player

See also
Haydar, for other spelling variants of the Arabic name
Heider (surname), a German surname
Darreh Heidar, a village in Khomeh Rural District, in the Central District of Aligudarz County, Lorestan Province, Iran
Ghaleh Ghaed Heidar, a village in Hayat Davud Rural District, in the Central District of Ganaveh County, Bushehr Province, Iran
Heidar Abad Roodbar, a village in Rudbar Rural District, in the Central District of Rudbar-e Jonubi County, Kerman Province, Iran
Heidari, an Iranian surname